Afterlife (stylised as afterlife) is a British mystery drama television series created by Stephen Volk. It follows university lecturer Robert Bridge (Andrew Lincoln) who becomes involved in a series of supernatural events surrounding medium Alison Mundy (Lesley Sharp). The series aired on ITV for two seasons from 24 September 2005 to 11 November 2006.

Plot
The main characters of the programme are the psychic Alison Mundy (played by Lesley Sharp) and the academic who becomes involved with her due to his skeptical interest in the paranormal, Robert Bridge (Andrew Lincoln). Set in Bristol, each of the six one-hour episodes of the first series sees Alison become involved in the appearance of a spirit and attempting to discover why it has come back to haunt the living. Robert becomes involved in the first episode, when Alison first moves to Bristol and her activities inadvertently result in the suicide of one of his students.

Following this, Robert decides to study Alison for a book. Alison's interest in Robert stems from her ability to see the spirit of his young son, whom Robert cannot see. Throughout the series a recurring theme is Alison's attempt to have Robert fully come to terms with the death of his son so that the boy's spirit can be eased and he can fully move on. In the first series it is learnt that Alison was seriously injured in a train crash several years before. The other survivors of the train crash seek her out to contact their own lost loved ones in the final episode of the first series, almost causing Alison's own death. Later, in the second series, it is established that Alison had these powers since she was little, the first 'ghost' she saw was her grandfather. During the second series, Robert is diagnosed with cancer. He dies in the series finale, after having spent much of the series helping Alison to overcome mental problems brought about by the ghost of her mother. He also reconciles her with her father.

Cast

Production
The programme was created by experienced television scriptwriter Stephen Volk, much of whose previous work had involved the paranormal, most famously the 1992 Screen One play Ghostwatch for BBC One. Volk also wrote five of the six episodes of the first series, the exception being the fifth episode which was scripted by Charlie Fletcher. The producer was Murray Ferguson, and the directors were Maurice Phillips (episodes 1 & 2), Charles Beeson (episodes 3 & 6) and Martyn Friend (episodes 4 & 5). The second series was directed by Charles Beeson, Martyn Friend and Ashley Pearce. The episodes were written by Stephen Volk, Mark Greig, Guy Burt and Mike Cullen. The music for both series was composed by Edmund Butt.

Volk had originally conceived the series during the mid-1990s according to SFX magazine, when "ITV was fleetingly interested in producing a homegrown supernatural series because of The X-Files''' success [in the UK]." The series remained unmade until Clerkenwell Films became interested, as did Lesley Sharp, the actress being very keen to star in the series. "She absolutely loved it and actually pestered ITV relentlessly, asking 'When are you gonna commission this series?' Eventually they did," Volk told SFX. Following the success of the first series, a second run was commissioned, beginning on 16 September 2006 on ITV in the UK. The first run has been released on DVD in the UK, including audio commentaries from the cast and crew.  The first series began a repeat run on ITV in the UK on Sunday evenings from 9pm from 23 July, although this was quickly abandoned and the repeats moved across to the digital television channel ITV3.

Critical reception
Previewing the first episode as one of "Today's Choices" for its day of transmission in the Radio Times listings magazine, television critic Alison Graham praised Afterlife as "[A] highly-promising mystery series... a taut and snappy spine-tingler, even if it does use some old-hat shocker techniques such as creaking floorboards, darkness, inexplicable noises and unexpected taps on the shoulder." Reviewing the same episode for The Guardian newspaper two days after its broadcast, critic Rupert Smith was also impressed: "What looked like being a deeply depressing hour was instantly enlivened by the appearance of Lesley Sharp, who has become in recent years television's favourite Everywoman... At last I can put my hand on my heart and give an unqualified cheer to a new primetime British drama series. Afterlife was scary without being over-gruesome, it kept a straight face while gleefully narrating a plot of pure old-fashioned hokum and it starred actors who are constantly, entirely watchable... Afterlife took the best bits of The X-Files, Jonathan Creek and, yes, Most Haunted, and turned them into terrific television."

The response remained positive through to the end of the series, with all subsequent episodes also being included in "Today's Choices" in the Radio Times. Previewing the sixth episode, Alison Graham was again positive, describing the series as a whole as having been "[A] consistently high-quality supernatural drama." Afterlife was also a success for ITV in terms of viewing figures. The first episode gathered an overnight average rating of 5.7 million, 25% of the total television audience for the time, winning its timeslot with nearly two million more viewers than the nearest competition on at the same time. The second episode improved to 6.2 million viewers, 29% of the available audience and again two million higher than its nearest competition on BBC One. Episode three gathered 5.4 million and a 25% share, which was identical to that gained by the BBC One competition (an edition of the semi-regular Test the Nation interactive quiz series). Viewing figures remained strong through to the final episode of the first series, which concluded the run by again winning its slot by two million viewers, with 5.8 million and a 28% audience share.

In April 2007 Afterlife'' received three nominations for the Monte Carlo Television Festival 2007. Lesley Sharp has been nominated as best actress, Andrew Lincoln as best actor and Murray Ferguson as best producer. Despite continued critical acclaim, a drop in ratings led ITV to pass on recommissioning the show for a third series.

International broadcast
In addition to broadcasts in Australia and the United Kingdom, the series has also played in Canada on the BBC Canada cable television network. People+Arts, a cable television station for Latin America, broadcast the show in early 2006. It also aired in New Zealand on TV One in early 2006, and the first series played in Spain on Cuatro during August 2006. The program premiered in the US in November 2006 on BBC America; however, only the first series was shown.

It also aired in Sweden on TV4. Iceland's Stöð 2 broadcast the last episode of Series 2 in January 2007. In Poland Series 1 started airing in June 2007 on TVP1, and RTL Klub broadcast Series 2 beginning July 2007 in Hungary. In Hong Kong, the show played from May 2008. In The Netherlands VARA aired Series 1 in June and July 2008. In France it was broadcast from January 2009. Belgian TV station Canvas aired both series starting December 2008.

Episode list

Series 1 (2005)

Series 2 (2006)

References and notes

External links
Clerkenwell Films official site
TV Central's afterlife website, Recaps, News, Chat and more

2000s British drama television series
2005 British television series debuts
2006 British television series endings
British drama television series
British supernatural television shows
ITV television dramas
Television shows shot in Bristol
Television shows set in Bristol
Television series by Clerkenwell Films
British horror fiction television series
2000s British horror television series